Madhuvidhu is a 1970 Indian Malayalam film,  directed by N. Sankaran Nair and produced by P. Subramaniam. The film stars Jayabharathi, Jose Prakash, Maya and Prameela in the lead roles. The film had musical score by M. B. Sreenivasan.

Cast

Vincent
Geethanjali
K. V. Shanthi
Jayabharathi
S. P. Pillai
Nellikode Bhaskaran
Jose Prakash
Aranmula Ponnamma
Alummoodan
Pankajavalli
Maya
Prameela
Annamma
KPAC Sunny
Mala Aravindan
Philip
Sarasamma

Soundtrack

References

External links
 

1970 films
1970s Malayalam-language films
Films directed by N. Sankaran Nair